During the 1996–97 English football season, Walsall F.C. competed in the Football League Second Division.

Season summary
In the 1996–97 season, Walsall had another satisfying mid-table finish under Nicholl, ending the season in 12th place. At the end of the season, Nicholl resigned because of family reasons.

Final league table

Results
Walsall's score comes first

Legend

Football League Second Division

FA Cup

League Cup

Football League Trophy

Squad

References

Walsall F.C. seasons
Walsall